Lukas Denner (born 19 June 1991) is an Austrian professional footballer who plays for ASV 13 as a left back.

Career
On 4 June 2014 after loaned out for 6 months, he signed permanently with SC Wiener Neustadt.

References

External links
Lukas Denner profile

1991 births
Living people
Austrian footballers
SK Rapid Wien players
SC Wiener Neustadt players
SV Grödig players
SV Horn players
2. Liga (Austria) players
Austrian Football Bundesliga players
Association football defenders